Gary Hoffman may refer to:

 Gary Hoffman (businessman) (born 1960), chairman of the Premier League
 Gary Hoffman (tackle) (born 1961), tackle in the National Football League
 Gary Hoffman (American football coach), American football player and coach